The Mountain Trails Club of New South Wales was an Australian conservation and bushwalking group.

The club was founded in 1914 by Myles Dunphy, Roy Rudder and Herbert Gallop Membership was by invitation only, and women were not permitted to join; the club espoused "a doctrine [of] manly and wholesome recreation". The Mountain Trails Club's work resulted in the formation of other bushwalking groups, such as the Sydney Bush Walkers Club, also founded by Dunphy.

References

Hiking organisations in Australia
Nature conservation organisations based in Australia
Organizations established in 1914